Weale may refer to:

Person
Adrian Weale
Anne Weale
Bobby Weale
Chris Weale
Henry Weale
John Weale (publisher) (1791–1862), English publisher
John Stuart Weale (born 1962), Royal Navy officer
Martin Weale
Robert Weale
Sam Weale
Simon Weale
Sydney Weale
Tommy Weale
William Henry James Weale, English art historian

Location
Weale, Michigan, an unincorporated community on Saginaw Bay